Vremya Time (1968)
 Kinopanorama Cinema panorama (1962)
 Utrenyaya pochta Morning mail (1974)
 Spokoynoy nochi, malyshi! Good night, kids! (1964)
 Chto? Gde? Kogda? What? Where? When? (1975)
 Yeralash (1974)
 Minuta molchaniya Minute of silence (1965)
 Goluboi ogonyok Little blue light
  Spotlight of perestroika (1987)
 Sluzhu Sovetskomu Soyuzu I serve the Soviet Union (1983)
 Futbolnoye obozreniye Football overview (1980)
 Mezhdunarodnaya panorama International panorama (1969)
 Do i posle polunochi Before and after the midnight (1987)
 Do 16 i starshe Before 16 and older (1983)
 V mire zhyvotnykh In the world of animals (1968)
 Vokrug smekha Around the laughter (1978)
 Budilnik Alarm (1965)
 Oba-na! Ugol-shou (1990)
 Fitil Fuse (1962)
 Pesnya goda Song of the year (1971)
 Ochevidnoye - neveroyatnoye Obvious - unbelievable (1973)
 Klub puteshestvennikov Wanderer's Club (1960)
 Zdorovie Health (1960)
 VID (1990)
 Vzglyad Glance (1987)
 Pole Chudes Field of Wonders (1990)
 Muzoboz Music overview
 Vedi
 Eldorado
 Shou birzha
 Sinematograf
 Matador
 Programma 500
 Sketch
 Delo
 Gospozha Udacha

See also
 Soviet Central Television

Television
Russian television-related lists
Television